Second-seeded pair Steve DeVries and David Macpherson won in the final against Bret Garnett and Jared Palmer. It was the pair's second victory in two weeks following their win at the AT&T Challenge in Atlanta.

Seeds
Champion seeds are indicated in bold text while text in italics indicates the round in which those seeds were eliminated.

  Ken Flach /  Todd Witsken (first round)
  Steve DeVries /  David Macpherson (champions)
  Jim Grabb /  David Wheaton (first round)
  Jacco Eltingh /  Tom Kempers (quarterfinals)

Draw

References
General

Specific

1992 U.S. Men's Clay Court Championships